Xie Zhi (谢智; born 7 March 1987 in Yunnan) is a Chinese swimmer. He won a gold medal at the 2010 Asian Games. It was the first medal for Yunnan in Asian Games.

References

External links 
 谢智夺50米蛙泳冠军 北岛康介爆冷无缘奖牌

Swimmers from Yunnan
1987 births
Living people
Male breaststroke swimmers
Asian Games medalists in swimming
Swimmers at the 2006 Asian Games
Swimmers at the 2010 Asian Games
Asian Games gold medalists for China
Medalists at the 2010 Asian Games